Still Life with a Chinese Porcelain Jar is a 1669 oil painting by Dutch artist Willem Kalf, located in the Indianapolis Museum of Art, which is in Indianapolis, Indiana. It is a sumptuous still life displaying the sort of costly wares that flowed through the Netherlands during its heyday as a trade center.

Description
In Still Life with a Chinese Porcelain Jar, Kalf selected an array of precious objects with which to showcase the wealth and refinement of the Netherlands and his own skills as a painter. Everything is expensive, imported, or both. The citrus fruit, glassware from Venice, and Chinese porcelain jar are evidence of Dutch sailors' enterprise. Local talent is displayed by Dutch silver and a rummer, or wineglass, with a cherub holding a cornucopia at its base. They stand on a marble tabletop with a carelessly crumpled oriental rug. Amid all that luxury is a lesson: a ticking watch on the silver platter reminds the viewer that such earthly riches are fleeting, and worth far less than eternal salvation. The carefully balanced composition, rich colors, and warm tonalities make this painting an object of beauty as well as moral edification.

Historical information
In the 1650s and '60s, as Amsterdam flourished as a hub of commerce and politics, Kalf perfected the pronk (display) still life to exhibit its prosperity. Using an arrangement of objects generally extremely similar to the ones in Still Life with a Chinese Porcelain Jar, depicted with a rich, velvety atmosphere and glistening light, Kalf captured his city's wealth for all to admire. His goal was to render the objects even more beautiful than reality did. This would establish painting as the preeminent art form. Goethe thought he succeeded, saying of Kalf's paintings that "there is no question that should I have the choice of the golden vessels or the picture, I would choose the picture."

Acquisition
The Herron School of Art acquired this artwork in 1945, a gift of Mrs. James W. Fesler in memory of Daniel W. and Elizabeth C. Marmon. It remained with the IMA during the division and currently hangs in the William C. Griffith Jr. and Carolyn C. Griffith Gallery. It has the accession number 45.9.

References

External links
IMA page 

Paintings by Willem Kalf
Paintings in the collection of the Indianapolis Museum of Art
1660s paintings
Still life paintings